The 2019–20 Duke Blue Devils women's basketball team represented Duke University during the 2019–20 NCAA Division I women's basketball season. Returning as head coach was Joanne P. McCallie in her 13th season. The team played its home games at Cameron Indoor Stadium in Durham, North Carolina as members of the Atlantic Coast Conference.

The Blue Devils finished the season 18–12 and 12–6 in ACC play to finish in third place.  As the third seed in the ACC tournament, they lost to Boston College in the Quarterfinals.  The NCAA tournament and WNIT were cancelled due to the COVID-19 outbreak.

Previous season
The 2018-19 Blue Devils finished the season 15–15, 6–10 in ACC play to finish tied for tenth place in the regular season. They were the eleventh seed in the ACC women's tournament, where they won their first game against Pittsburgh and fell to Florida State in the Second Round. They did not receive an invitation to a post-season tournament.

Off-season

Recruiting Class

Source:

Roster

Rankings
2019–20 NCAA Division I women's basketball rankings

Coaches did not release a Week 2 poll and AP does not release a final poll.  Due to the cancellation of the NCAA Tournament, the coaches poll did not release a final ranking.

Schedule

Source

|-
!colspan=12 style="background:#001A57; color:#FFFFFF;"| Exhibition

|-
!colspan=12 style="background:#001A57; color:#FFFFFF;"| Regular season

|-
!colspan=12 style="background:#001A57;"| ACC Women's Tournament

See also
 2019–20 Duke Blue Devils men's basketball team

References

Duke Blue Devils women's basketball seasons
Duke